Nuri Çolak (born 17 August 1975) is a retired Turkish football defender.

While at Kocaelispor he scored the winning goal in the 1997 Turkish Cup Final against Trabzonspor, which helped his team to a 2-1 aggregate win.

Honours

Club
 Kocaelispor
 Turkish Cup (2): 1996–97, 2001–02

References

1975 births
Living people
Turkish footballers
Kocaelispor footballers
Gaziantepspor footballers
Turanspor footballers
Bozüyükspor footballers
Association football defenders
Turkey under-21 international footballers
Turkey international footballers